Aigialeia is a municipality and a former province (επαρχία) in the eastern part of the Achaea regional unit, Greece. The seat of the municipality is the town Aigio. The municipality has an area of 723.063 km2. The main towns are Aigio, Akrata and Diakopto. The municipality Aigialeia stretches from the south coast of the Gulf of Corinth to the mountainous interior of the Peloponnese peninsula. The main rivers of the municipality are the Selinountas and the Vouraikos.

Municipality
The municipality Aigialeia was formed at the 2011 local government reform by the merger of the following 6 former municipalities, that became municipal units:
Aigeira
Aigio
Akrata
Diakopto
Erineos
Sympoliteia

Province
The province of Aigialeia was one of the three provinces of Achaea. Its territory corresponded with that of the current municipality, except the municipal unit Erineos. It was abolished in 2006.

History

Present Aigialeia was the territory of the ancient Achaeans. Several towns of the Achaean League were located here: Rhypes, Aegium, Ceryneia, Boura, Helice, Aegae and Aigeira. Helice was submerged as a result an earthquake, which also destroyed Boura. In Roman times, the most important towns were Aegium and Aigeira. In the Middle Ages, the area was ruled by the Byzantines, Slavs, Franks, Venetians, and from the 16th century the Ottoman Turks. Aigialeia was liberated in the first stage of the Greek War of Independence, in 1821. Aigio was struck by an earthquake in 1995, damaging several buildings. The 2007 Greek forest fires cause great damage in the mountains of Aigialeia.

Transport

Roads
The main highways in Aigialeia are:
Greek National Road 8, old road Athens – Corinth – Rio – Patras
Greek National Road 8A (part of E55 and E65): Athens – Corinth – Rio – Patras
Greek National Road 31: Aigio – Kalavryta

Railways

The Piraeus, Athens and Peloponnese Railways line Athens – Corinth – Aigio – Patras – Pyrgos – Kyparissia runs through Aigialeia. The Diakofto–Kalavryta Railway is a rack railway, offering passenger service as well.

Media

Newspapers, fanzines and others

Filodimos – Aigio
Frouros tis Anatolikis Aigialeias
Proti tis Aigaleias – Aigio and Aigaleia
Styx – Akrata

Radio
Radio Aigio – 99.2 FM

Television
AXION – Aigio

Sporting clubs

Panegialios – Football League
Anagennisi/Aias Sympoliteias – Rododafni
Aris Valimitika
Asteras Temenis
Diakopto AC – Diakopto – fourth division
Egieas Egion
Olympiakos Aigio – Aigio, fourth division
Thyella Aigio – Aigio
A.O. Vouraikos Diakopto
A.O. Ziria
Aris Longou – Longos, Achaea
A.O. Thyella Aigeiras – Aigeira (1980-2018)
A.O. Akrata – Akrata (1970-2018)
A.E. Aigeiras/Akratas – Aigeira (merger of the two local clubs since July 2018)

References

 
Municipalities of Western Greece
Provinces of Greece
Achaea
Populated places in Achaea